Perkova is a rural locality (a village) in Beloyevskoye Rural Settlement, Kudymkarsky District, Perm Krai, Russia. The population was 121 as of 2010. There are four streets.

Geography 

References 

Rural localities in Kudymkarsky District